Poland competed at the 1962 European Athletics Championships in Belgrade, Yugoslavia, from 12-16 September 1962. A delegation of 50 athletes were sent to represent the country.

Medals

References

European Athletics Championships
1962
Nations at the 1962 European Athletics Championships